Avi Peretz may refer to:

Avi Peretz (footballer) (born 1971), Israeli football player
Avi Peretz (singer) (born 1966), Israeli singer